McHenry may refer to:

People 
 McHenry (name)

Places in the United States 
 McHenry, California, an unincorporated town
 McHenry Mansion in Modesto, California
 McHenry County, Illinois
 McHenry, Illinois, a city in McHenry County
 McHenry Dam, on the Fox River in Illinois
 McHenry, Kentucky, a city
 McHenry, Maryland
 Fort McHenry, Baltimore County, Maryland
 McHenry, Mississippi, an unincorporated community
 McHenry County, North Dakota
 McHenry, North Dakota, in Foster County
 McHenry, Virginia, an unincorporated community
 McHenry Township (disambiguation)

Other uses 
Forward Operating Base McHenry in Hawija, Iraq
 McHenry Library, University of California, Santa Cruz

See also 
 Fort Henry (disambiguation)